Birds Canada (formerly Bird Studies Canada) is Canada's national bird conservation organization. Birds Canada began as the Long Point Bird Observatory in 1960, changing its name in 1998 to reflect the growing national scope of its research programs. The name was changed again in 2019 to Birds Canada. Its mission is to advance the understanding, appreciation and conservation of wild birds and their habitats through studies that engage the skills, enthusiasm and support of volunteers, members, staff and the interested public. Birds Canada conducts a wide range of local, regional, national and international programs, dependent upon the active involvement of thousands of volunteer "Citizen Scientists", guided by a small group of professional scientists. Its national headquarters are located near Port Rowan and Long Point, Ontario, Canada.

Motus wildlife tracking network is a program of Birds Canada, it was launched in 2014 in the US and Canada, by 2022 more than 1,500 receiver stations have been installed in 34 countries, most receivers are concentrated in the United States and Canada. 

The president of Birds Canada is Patrick Nadeau.

See also
Nature Canada
BirdLife International

References

External links
Official website
The State of Canada's Birds

Nature conservation organizations based in Canada
Organizations established in 1960
1960 establishments in Canada
Scientific organizations based in Canada
Norfolk County, Ontario
Ornithological organizations
Bird conservation organizations
Environmental organizations based in Ontario